was a Japanese photographer.

He was student of Shimooka Renjo in 1871. After a short training period he opened a photo studio in Tokyo the same year, and moved to Asakusa the following year to become one of Tokyo's top portrait studios during the late 19th century. He is the first Japanese photographer to use dry plate negatives which he imported in 1883 and made him a "quick photographer" specializing in family portraits.

He succeeded in photographing fireworks in 1889. His photograph of a torpedo explosion in the Sumida River in 1883 became very famous. Another  well-known of his photographs is "Collage of Babies: One Thousand and Seven Hundred Children That in Three Years Came to My Shop", ca. 1893. San Francisco Museum of Modern Art owns a copy. Also served as a politician in the Asakusa Ward Council and Tokyo City Council.

References

Japanese photographers
1845 births
1910 deaths